Gift of the Night Fury is a 2011 American computer-animated short film by DreamWorks Animation and directed by Tom Owens. It was released on November 15, 2011 on DVD and Blu-ray, along with another original animated short film Book of Dragons.

Based on How to Train Your Dragon, the short takes place in the middle of preparing for the Viking winter holiday. After all dragons inexplicably fly away, the last one of them unwittingly kidnaps Hiccup. Jay Baruchel, Gerard Butler, Craig Ferguson, America Ferrera, Jonah Hill, T.J. Miller, Kristen Wiig, and Christopher Mintz-Plasse all reprise their roles from the original film.

Plot
Right before Berk's traditional winter holiday of Snoggletog, all the dragons of Berk unexpectedly depart, leaving everyone distraught – except for Toothless, who cannot fly by himself. Out of compassion, Hiccup builds him a new automatic prosthesis allowing him independent flight, thus gifting him his freedom; he then flies off too.

Three days later, Meatlug, Fishlegs' dragon whom he had secretly kept chained, escapes, inadvertently taking Hiccup with her. Meatlug flies to an island with hot springs, where all the dragons (except Toothless, who is nowhere to be found) have been hatching their eggs. Meanwhile, on Berk, Astrid and the other teens discover dragon eggs in Meatlug's nest, which they scatter around Berk in hopes of lifting the villagers' spirits; this plan backfires, because dragon eggs hatch explosively (normally underwater). Berk is severely damaged in the process.

On the dragons' island, Hiccup meets Stormfly (Astrid's dragon) and Hookfang (Snotlout's dragon) and their newly-hatched babies; in asking for a ride home, he inadvertently triggers the dragons' return migration. He quickly decides to use a nearby wrecked ship to carry the baby dragons, who cannot yet fly as far as Berk. The Berkians are overjoyed at their dragons' return and the new babies, though Hiccup is still distraught at Toothless' absence. During the ensuing Snoggletog celebration, Toothless returns with Hiccup's lost helmet, which he had dropped into the sea earlier; the two enjoy a heartfelt reunion.

The next day, Toothless discards his new tail, begging Hiccup to put the old tailfin on him and fly with him by controlling his fin manually as opposed to passively riding him; in doing so, he gives Hiccup a "better gift" – his friendship and companionship.

Voice cast
 Jay Baruchel as Hiccup Horrendous Haddock III
 America Ferrera as Astrid Hofferson
 Craig Ferguson as Gobber the Belch
 Gerard Butler as Stoick the Vast
 Christopher Mintz-Plasse as Fishlegs Ingerman
 Jonah Hill as Snotlout Jorgenson
 T.J. Miller as Tuffnut Thorston
 Kristen Wiig as Ruffnut Thorston

Home media
Dragons: Gift of the Night Fury was released on Blu-ray and DVD on November 15, 2011 along with Book of Dragons. It was released on Blu-ray and DVD as part of the DreamWorks Holiday Classics. It was re-released on DVD on October 1, 2013 along with Shrek the Halls, Merry Madagascar, Kung Fu Panda Holiday, and The Croods. The short was released again on Blu-ray and DVD on October 15, 2019 by Universal Pictures Home Entertainment, this time as part of the DreamWorks Ultimate Holiday Collection set.

Notes

References

External links

 
 

2011 films
2011 computer-animated films
2010s American animated films
2010s animated short films
2010s children's animated films
DreamWorks Animation animated short films
Animated films about dragons
Animated films based on children's books
How to Train Your Dragon
Films scored by Dominic Lewis
Films scored by John Powell
Films set on fictional islands
2010s children's adventure films
2010s English-language films